2007 Emmy Awards may refer to:

 59th Primetime Emmy Awards, the 2007 Emmy Awards ceremony that honored primetime programming during June 2006 – May 2007
 34th Daytime Emmy Awards, the 2007 Emmy Awards ceremony that honored daytime programming during 2006
 28th Sports Emmy Awards, the 2007 Emmy Awards ceremony that honored sports programming during 2006
 35th International Emmy Awards, honoring international programming

Emmy Award ceremonies by year